Robert Francis Jordan (October 31, 1927 – January 10, 2004) was an American bridge player. During the 1960s he played on three North America or USA open teams that were runners-up to Italy (the Blue Team) in world championships. Arthur Robinson was his regular partner was on all three occasions.

Jordan was born in New York City and served briefly in the U.S. Army during World War II. Afterward he was in business "dealing cemetery lots". He lived "all his bridge-playing life in Philadelphia" but later relocated to Cincinnati, Ohio (sometime before 1994) and to Florida.

Jordan died of lung cancer at home in West Palm Beach, Florida. He was survived by his third wife Lorraine, one brother, and three children. His son, Scott Jordan revealed that he beat his wife in a Facebook post.

Bridge accomplishments

Wins

 North American Bridge Championships (7)
 Silodor Open Pairs (2) 1960, 1962 
 Vanderbilt (2) 1961, 1968 
 Chicago Mixed Board-a-Match (1) 1959 
 Reisinger (2) 1966, 1967

Runners-up

 North American Bridge Championships
 Wernher Open Pairs (1) 1956 
 Hilliard Mixed Pairs (1) 1961 
 Vanderbilt (1) 1965 
 Reisinger (1) 1961

References

External links
 

1927 births
2004 deaths
American contract bridge players
Bermuda Bowl players
Sportspeople from Philadelphia
Deaths from lung cancer in Florida
Sportspeople from New York City